The 2017 Swedish Golf Tour was the 34th season of the Swedish Golf Tour.

All tournaments also featured on the 2017 Nordic Golf League.

Schedule
The following table lists official events during the 2017 season.

Order of Merit
The Order of Merit was based on prize money won during the season, calculated using a points-based system.

See also
2017 Danish Golf Tour
2017 Swedish Golf Tour (women)

Notes

References

Swedish Golf Tour
Swedish Golf Tour